Thunderstorms & Neon Signs is the debut album by American country musician Wayne Hancock, released in 1995 on Dejadisc. It was reissued by Ark21 in 1998. The album’s title track was covered by Hank Williams III on his debut album Risin' Outlaw.

Track listing
All songs written by Wayne Hancock; except where noted 
 "Juke Joint Jumping" – 3:18
 "Poor Boy Blues" – 2:20
 "Thunderstorms and Neon Signs" – 3:42
 "She's My Baby" – 2:31
 "Big City Good Time Gal" – 2:57
 "Ain't Nobody's Blues But My Own" – 4:06
 "Double A Daddy" – 3:25
 "Why Don't You Leave Me Alone" – 2:50
 "Tag Along" – 2:18
 "Cold Lonesome Wind" – 4:24
 "Locomotive Joe" – 2:11
 "No Loving Tonight" – 1:39
 "Friday and Saturday Night" – 2:36
 "Summertime" – 5:42 (DuBose Heyward, George Gershwin, Ira Gershwin)

Personnel 

Wayne Hancock – Acoustic Guitar and vocals
Rebecca Hancock Snow – Vocals
Paul Skelton – Guitar
Bob Stafford – Guitar
Sue Foley – Guitar
Ric Ramerez – Bass and Background Vocals
Kevin Smith – Bass
Herb Steiner – Steel Guitar
Lloyd Maines – Steel Guitar 
Stan Smith – Clarinet
Bill Madonado – Background Vocals

See also
 1995 in music

External links
 Wayne "The Train" Hancock's Official web site  
 [ Wayne Hancock on Allmusic] 
 Wayne Hancock on rockabilly.net 
 Wayne Hancock collection at the Internet Archive's live music archive

Wayne Hancock albums
1995 debut albums